"Save The Overtime (For Me)" is a 1983 single by the R&B and pop group, Gladys Knight and the Pips. The song, under the artistic direction of Leon Sylvers III (known for collaborating on Shalamar hits), was done in a soulful boogie style. The single was released from their LP Visions and reached number sixty-six on the Hot 100, but was more successful on the R&B where it hit number one for a single week in mid 1983. The single was the first time the group hit number one on the R&B chart since 1974.

7-inch single 
Save The Overtime (For Me) - 3:50
Ain't No Greater Love - 4:53

12-inch single 
Save The Overtime (For Me) - 6:38
Save The Overtime (For Me) (instrumental) - 6:38

References

1983 singles
Boogie songs
Gladys Knight & the Pips songs
1983 songs
Columbia Records singles